Wangary is a town on the Eyre Peninsula in South Australia, located  west of Port Lincoln on the Flinders Highway near Coffin Bay.

It is located in the cadastral Hundred of Lake Wangary. It surrounds the freshwater Lake Wangary.

The government town of Wangary was surveyed in 1871 though never formally proclaimed. It was incorporated into the modern broader locality of Wangary when the boundaries of the latter were formalised in October 2003. The Old Lake Wangary Hotel was built in 1871, and is one of the main surviving structures in town; it has not had a liquor license since 1933, but remains open as a general store. The sports oval and ruins of the former post office (established 1862, closed 1976), coach house and bakery are located nearby. Lake Wangary Primary School, located on Third Street, has existed since 1933.

Lake Wangary Cemetery, located on Snapper Hill Road, was first proclaimed in 1882 and used until the early 1900s, before being resurveyed as a modern cemetery in 1984. It is now maintained by the local council.

There are nearby inselbergs called the Marble Range. They possess many unique lifeforms, some of which has been described scientifically.

Colonial views of the Lake Wangary area were done in the 1840s by English Colonial Artist George French Angas. His artwork is incorporated into one of South Australia's most valuable books – 'South Australia Illustrated'.

See also
List of cities and towns in South Australia
Eyre Peninsula bushfire
Murrunatta Conservation Park
Kellidie Bay Conservation Park

References

Towns in South Australia
Eyre Peninsula